Minuscule 710 (in the Gregory-Aland numbering), ε348 (von Soden), is a Greek minuscule manuscript of the New Testament, on parchment. Palaeographically it has been assigned to the 13th century. The manuscript is lacunose. Scrivener labelled it as 81e.

Description 

The codex contains the text of the four Gospels on 183 parchment leaves (size ),
with some lacunae.

 Lacunae
Matthew 19:15-21:19; 21:31-41; 22:7-28:20; Mark 1:9-3:18; 3:35-15:15; 15:32-16:14; Luke 1:8-2:19; 3:17-4:40; 5:8-22:5; 22:36-23:10; John 8:4-21:18.

The text is written in one column per page, 23-24 lines per page.

Text 

The Greek text of the codex is a representative of the Byzantine text-type. Hermann von Soden classified it to the textual family Kx. Kurt Aland did not place it in any Category.

According to the Claremont Profile Method it represents mixed Byzantine text in Luke 1, Kx in Luke 10, and textual group Λ in Luke 20.

History 

Scrivener and Gregory dated the manuscript to the 13th century. Currently the manuscript is dated by the INTF to the 13th century.

It was bought in 1883 from William Ward, who brought the manuscript from Ephesus.

It was added to the list of New Testament manuscripts by Scrivener (81) and Gregory (710). Gregory saw the manuscript in 1883.

At present the manuscript is housed at the Bodleian Library (MS. Auct. T. inf. 1. 5) in Oxford.

See also 

 List of New Testament minuscules
 Biblical manuscript
 Textual criticism

References

Further reading

External links 
 MSS. Auctarium at the Bodleian Library

Greek New Testament minuscules
13th-century biblical manuscripts
Bodleian Library collection